This is the results breakdown of the local elections held in Extremadura on 10 June 1987. The following tables show detailed results in the autonomous community's most populous municipalities, sorted alphabetically.

City control
The following table lists party control in the most populous municipalities, including provincial capitals (shown in bold). Gains for a party are displayed with the cell's background shaded in that party's colour.

Municipalities

Almendralejo
Population: 24,966

Badajoz
Population: 118,852

Cáceres
Population: 69,193

Mérida
Population: 51,641

Plasencia
Population: 32,430

See also
1987 Extremaduran regional election

References

Extremadura
1987